Tafissour is a town and commune in Sidi Bel Abbès Province in north-western Algeria. According to the 1998 census it has a population of 1864 and 2515 according to the 2008 census.

References

Communes of Sidi Bel Abbès Province
Cities in Algeria
Algeria